Goran Trpevski (born 2 March 1977) is a former Swedish football player.

External sources

 Goran Trpevski Football Tips Site.

Living people
1977 births
Footballers from Malmö
Swedish footballers
Sweden youth international footballers
Sweden under-21 international footballers
Swedish expatriate footballers
Allsvenskan players
Malmö FF players
Apollon Smyrnis F.C. players
Expatriate footballers in Greece
Association football midfielders